Amphetamine is a 2010 Hong Kong film starring Byron Pang and Thomas Price. It revolves around the story of an ethnic Chinese fitness trainer, Kafka, who meets Daniel, a business executive. The film is directed by acclaimed Hong Kong Chinese filmmaker Scud, the production-crediting name of Danny Cheng Wan-Cheung. It was nominated for a Teddy Award at the Berlin International Film Festival of 2010. It explores several themes traditionally regarded as 'taboo' in Hong Kong society in an unusually open, convention-defying way, and features full-frontal male nudity in several scenes. It is the third of seven publicly released films by Scud. The six other films are: City Without Baseball in 2008, Permanent Residence in 2009, Love Actually... Sucks! in 2011, Voyage in 2013, Utopians in 2015 and Thirty Years of Adonis in 2017. The eighth film, Apostles, was made in 2022, as was the ninth, Bodyshop, but neither have yet been released. The tenth and final film, Naked Nations: Hong Kong Tribe, is currently in production.

Plot
Set after the 2008 financial collapse, the story follows Kafka, a swimming instructor, when he meets Daniel, a wealthy investment banker who changes his life. Daniel is openly gay, and helps Kafka to come out of the closet, despite Kafka being Catholic and proclaims to be straight, and they quickly fall in love.

Their relationship is complicated by Kafka's erratic behaviour, stemming from habitual abuse of amphetamine. Also a contributing factor is his impotence, which can be attributed to when he was violently gang-raped by three men, and sodomised with a wooden stick, after saving their original target, a woman.

After the death of his mother, Kafka goes into a tailspin, raping Daniel's best friend, Linda, and flooding his and Daniel's apartment. When Daniel tries to console Linda, the two end up having sex, and Kafka sees them.

The next morning, Daniel does amphetamine with Kafka, and Kafka confesses that despite everything he's done wrong, he still loves Daniel. Daniel affirms their relationship by asking Kafka to return to Australia with him, where they can get married, but Kafka asks for more time.

At Daniel's going away party, Kafka is stripped totally naked, painted with silver body paint and calligraphy, and given large, white angel wings to wear (an image which is seen at the beginning of the film). He then jumps off of the balcony of the apartment, attempting to fly, but escapes mostly uninjured.

When he wakes up and doesn't see Daniel, Kafka escapes from the hospital and looks for him on the bridge they visited on their first date. Distraught and hallucinating from detox, he jumps off the bridge, into the still-frozen water and dies, with his final thoughts being those of him and Daniel, together and swimming.

Cast
 Byron Pang as Kafka
 Tom Price as Daniel
 Linda So as May
 Winnie Leung as Linda

Wikipedia Chinese
安非他命_(電影) Amphetamine (film)

VCD, DVD and Blu-ray
An uncut version of this ArtWalker film was internationally released on a Panorama (HK) VCD, DVD and on Blu-ray Disc on 24 September 2010.

Controversy
The level III-rated film met controversy in Hong Kong when the Television and Entertainment Licensing Authority asked for several shots of anal intercourse to be cut before public screening. As the whole film had been allowed to screen as the closing film of the 34th Hong Kong International Film Festival, Scud protested against the authority's decision and complained to the Chief Executive Donald Tsang. The shots in concern were finally blackened-out but with sound in public screening as a protest by Scud.

Films by the same director/producer

See also
 Hong Kong films of 2010
 List of lesbian, gay, bisexual or transgender-related films
 List of lesbian, gay, bisexual, or transgender-related films by storyline
 Nudity in film (East Asian cinema since 1929)

References

External links

Chinese Movie Database – English version

2010 films
2010 drama films
2010 LGBT-related films
2010s Cantonese-language films
Chinese independent films
Chinese-language films
Chinese LGBT-related films
Films directed by Scud (filmmaker)
Films set in Hong Kong
Gay-related films
English-language Hong Kong films
Hong Kong independent films
Hong Kong LGBT-related films
LGBT-related drama films
Male bisexuality in film
2010 independent films
2010s Hong Kong films